Liberty Triangle is an unincorporated area and census-designated place (CDP) in southwestern Marion County, Florida, United States. It is bordered to the north by Ocala, the county seat, to the east by Interstate 75, and to the northwest by Florida State Road 200.

Liberty Triangle was first listed as a CDP prior to the 2020 census, at which time the population was 23,759.

Demographics

References 

Census-designated places in Marion County, Florida
Census-designated places in Florida